The Battle of the Shangani took place on 25 October 1893 during the First Matabele War in what is now Zimbabwe. A British column was attacked during night by a large force of Matabele warriors. The British repulsed them with a heavy loss of life to the Matabele force. The battle is noted for being the first battle in which the Maxim gun played an important role.

Context
The leaders of British Southern Africa Cecil Rhodes and Leander Starr Jameson had responded to a raid by the Matabele with force. A British column commanded by Major Patrick William Forbes was sent into Matabeleland. It advanced towards Bulawayo, the territory's capital. The force was made up of around seven-hundred men of the paramilitary British South Africa Police, along with an unknown number of native auxiliaries. In addition to rifles, the column was equipped with five Maxim guns, three other rapid-fire guns, two cannon, and 200 rifles.

Battle
The Matabele (Ndebele) king Lobengula planned a surprise attack at night. The British set up camp at the  Shangani river, forming into a circular defensive laager on the model pioneered by the Boers. Lobengula's generals Manonda and Mjaan launched the attack with 5–6,000 warriors. However, the British sentries soon alerted the soldiers. According to trooper Jack Carruthers the attack came at 2:15 a.m., "a peaceful night, clear sky but on the dark side. The bugles gave the alarm, the camp was all excitement in a moment, all noise with the opening of ammunition boxes and shouting of officers, the men were getting into their places... the scouts had hardly time to save themselves. The outer sentries also had narrow escapes getting back into laager."

Lobengula's troops were a disciplined force by pre-colonial African standards, and were equipped with both assegais and Martini Henry rifles, but the British pioneers' Maxim guns, which had never before been used in battle, far exceeded expectations, according to an eyewitness "mow[ing] them down literally like grass". By the time the Matabele withdrew, they had suffered around 1,500 fatalities; the BSAP, on the other hand, had lost only four men. The devastating effectiveness of the Maxims was such that they cut down wave after wave of advancing Matabele. Hubert Hervey, one of the British troopers, commented that the Matabele were not able to make good use of their own weapons: "the Matabele firing was very inaccurate and poor, and did hardly any damage."

The defeated Matabele left the battlefield, while their leader Manonda committed suicide by hanging himself. According to Carruthers, he was not alone, "The Matebele retreated at daylight; several had hung themselves to trees with their girdles rather than return beaten. One in desperation, it seemed, had fallen on his own assegai."

Aftermath
The battle proved the effectiveness of the Maxim machine gun, which was to become central to later colonial battles. Cecil Rhodes, writing to Sir Gordon Sprigg, said that "the shooting must have been excellent. . . . It proves the [Police] men were not only brave, but cool, and did not lose their heads, though surrounded with the hordes."

References

African resistance to colonialism
Conflicts in 1893
1893 in Matabeleland
Shangani